The knockout stage of the 2007 CAF Champions League was played from 21 September to 9 November 2007.

Bracket

Semi-finals 
The first legs were played on 21–23 September and the second legs on 5–7 October.

                       

|}

Final 

                        
|}

References

External links
2007 CAF Champions League - todor66.com

Knockout stage